GCRG can refer to:

 Gem City Rollergirls, from Dayton, Ohio
 Granite City Roller Girls, from Aberdeen in Scotland